Kerry Payne (née Shacklock; born 30 October 1971) is an English former synchronised swimmer. She represented Great Britain at the 1992 Olympic Games in Barcelona, finishing seventh in the solo event and sixth in the duet with Laila Vakil. She also won two bronze medals at the 1993 European Championships, and is a four-time Commonwealth Games silver medalist.

Achievements

References

1971 births
British synchronised swimmers
Living people
Olympic synchronised swimmers of Great Britain
Synchronized swimmers at the 1992 Summer Olympics
Commonwealth Games silver medallists for England
Commonwealth Games medallists in synchronised swimming
Synchronised swimmers at the 1990 Commonwealth Games
Synchronised swimmers at the 1994 Commonwealth Games
Medallists at the 1990 Commonwealth Games
Medallists at the 1994 Commonwealth Games